Cameron Airport is an airport located in Angleton, Texas, United States that closed in 2004.

References

Airports in Texas
Defunct airports in Texas